The 1885 Detroit Wolverines finished the season with a 41–67 record, finishing in sixth place in the National League.

Regular season

Season standings

Record vs. opponents

Notable transactions 
 June 15, 1885: Jim Keenan was purchased by the Wolverines from the Indianapolis Hoosiers.
 June 25, 1885: Milt Scott was purchased from the Wolverines by the Pittsburgh Alleghenys.
 July 1, 1885: Jim Keenan jumped from the Wolverines to the Cincinnati Red Stockings.

Roster

Player stats

Batting

Starters by position 
Note: Pos = Position; G = Games played; AB = At bats; H = Hits; Avg. = Batting average; HR = Home runs; RBI = Runs batted in

Other batters 
Note: G = Games played; AB = At bats; H = Hits; Avg. = Batting average; HR = Home runs; RBI = Runs batted in

Pitching

Starting pitchers 
Note: G = Games pitched; IP = Innings pitched; W = Wins; L = Losses; ERA = Earned run average; SO = Strikeouts

Relief pitchers 
Note: G = Games pitched; W = Wins; L = Losses; SV = Saves; ERA = Earned run average; SO = Strikeouts

Notes

References 
1885 Detroit Wolverines season at Baseball Reference

Detroit Wolverines seasons
Detroit Wolverines season
Detroit Wolv
1880s in Detroit